Carrigan v Redwood [1910] NZGazLawRp 193; (1910) 30 NZLR 244; (1910) 13 GLR 183 is a cited case in New Zealand law regarding trusts.

References

High Court of New Zealand cases